Enter My Religion is the second album by Leaves' Eyes female vocalist and lyricist Liv Kristine. It was released in 2006 on Roadrunner Records.

Background
In an interview Liv Kristine gave with Brave Words And Bloody Knuckles in 2006, she was quoted as saying "When it comes to music, doing one thing is not enough. I've got a lot of different sources of musical inspiration, and I know that doing one thing is easy and saves time, but I wouldn't know what I would do with all my ideas and dreams if I went that direction. I have to bring them to life somehow, so doing a solo project is a way of being creative.
With me, the creative process is an ongoing thing, so it really comes down to the planning. My husband (Atrocity frontman/producer Alex Krull) and I have the same profession, I have a fantastic mother-in-law, and I'm also able to close the door when I leave the studio or tour bus. Time off is time off and work is work, and I enjoy both."

Reviews

The album received mixed reviews. In an early 2007 issue of Terrorizer Magazine, it got 2 of 10, and the reviewer called it "Euro-pop bilge". But Brave Words & Bloody Knuckles thought differently, calling it "a melancholic pop-rock album geared towards a non-metal audience. While it does have commercial potential-particularly on the European market- it is also a surprisingly strong multi-faceted piece of work well distanced from the Britney Spears/P!nk/Jessica Simpson formula."

Track listing

Production
Produced, Mixed & Mastered By Alexander Krull
Recorded by Alexander Krull, Mathias Röderer and Thorsten Bauer

Personnel
Liv Kristine: Main vocal
 Thorsten Bauer: Electric, acoustic and flamenco guitars, saz, mandolin, sitar, oud, piano
 Alexander Krull: Keyboards, programming and samples
 Timon Birkhofer: Bass, cello, piano, vocal backing
 Jana Kallenberg: Violin
 Dimitrios Argyropolous: Bouzouki, tzoura
 Jean Paul: Accordion
 Katharina Klein: Flute
 Florian Tekale: Keyboards, piano
 Moritz Neuner: Drums, percussion

References

Liv Kristine "Enter My Religion" CD Liner Notes; Roadrunner Records, 2006

2006 albums
Liv Kristine albums
Roadrunner Records albums
Albums produced by Alexander Krull